Marvin Ladji Gakpa (born 1 November 1993) is a French professional footballer who plays as a forward for Turkish club Manisa.

Club career
On 7 September 2021, he signed a three-year contract with Manisa in Turkey.

Personal life
Born in France, Gakpa is of Ivorian and Algerian descent.

Career statistics

References

External links
 
 
 

1993 births
Living people
French footballers
French expatriate footballers
Sportspeople from Dunkirk
French sportspeople of Algerian descent
French sportspeople of Ivorian descent
Footballers from Hauts-de-France
Association football forwards
Ligue 1 players
Ligue 2 players
FC Lorient players
AC Ajaccio players
US Quevilly-Rouen Métropole players
FC Metz players
Paris FC players
Manisa FK footballers
Expatriate footballers in Turkey
French expatriate sportspeople in Turkey